The 2012/13 FAW Women's Cup was the 21st season of Wales' national association football knock-out competition. It saw 28 clubs apply for entry, three less than previous season. In the same final as last year, Cardiff City Ladies defended their title by winning 3–1 over Cardiff Met. Ladies.

Format
Play is a straight knock-out. The four semi finalists from the previous season were given a bye to the second round. They are holders Cardiff City Ladies, runners up Cardiff Met. Ladies (formerly UWIC), as well as semi-finalists Swansea City and Port Talbot Town (formerly Trefelin).

First round
The draw for the first round is regionalised between North and South Wales . 
Bye to second round: Cardiff City Ladies, Cardiff Met. Ladies, Swansea City and Port Talbot Town 

North:

South

 Game was originally drawn to be played at Cyncoed Ladies.

Second round
Round was played on 21 and 28 October 2012. The match between Caernarfon Town and Llanidloes has been switched to a home tie at Llanidloes after it was postponed to 4 November due to bad weather.

Quarter finals

Round to be played Sunday 18 November 2012

Semi finals
Round to be played on 17 February 2013.

Final
Both teams played last year's final, which Cardiff City won in a penalty shoot-out.

City again won the title.

References

External links
Cup at faw.org.uk

FAW Women's Cup
Women
Cup